was a town located in Sayō District, Hyōgo Prefecture, Japan.

As of 2003, the town had an estimated population of 3,305 and a density of 65.85 persons per km². The total area was 50.19 km².

On October 1, 2005, Mikazuki, along with the towns of Kōzuki and Nankō (all from Sayō District), was merged into the expanded town of Sayō.

External links
 Mikazuki official website in Japanese

Dissolved municipalities of Hyōgo Prefecture
Sayō, Hyōgo